Perry Stream is an  river in northern New Hampshire in the United States. It is a tributary of the Connecticut River, which flows south to Long Island Sound, an arm of the Atlantic Ocean.

Perry Stream rises in the highlands forming the Canada–United States border, just west of the Connecticut Lakes. The entire length of the stream is within the town of Pittsburg, New Hampshire, the largest town in the state. The stream flows southwest through logging country, reaching the Connecticut River near the site known as Happy Valley.

See also 

 List of New Hampshire rivers

References

Rivers of New Hampshire
Rivers of Coös County, New Hampshire
Pittsburg, New Hampshire
Tributaries of the Connecticut River